"4st 7lb" is a song by Welsh alternative rock band, Manic Street Preachers, from the band's third album, The Holy Bible.

Music and lyrics 
Musically, the song features art rock riffs and the extensive addition of guitar reverb. The verse riff in the first half of the song revolves around an arpeggiated diminished seventh chord, and has been compared to that of "Eton Rifles" by The Jam. Then, the song slows down and becomes a more atmospheric, minimalist base.

Lyrically, the song describes advanced-stage anorexia; it is about a teenage girl who wants "to be so skinny, that she rots from view". It has been widely interpreted as a reflection of the band's guitarist and lyricist Richey Edwards' own personal struggle with the disease, which was confirmed by the band's bass guitarist and co-lyricist Nicky Wire.

Reception 
The song received acclaim from music critics. Nick Butler of Sputnikmusic praised the song, referring it as "quite simply, genius". He also commented that the song "contains one of the best lyrics even written by anyone, replete with the awesome chorus", while describing the song's musical structure in detail. Stephen Thomas Erlewine of AllMusic wrote: "the diary of anorexia '4st 7lb' is one of the most chilling songs in rock & roll". Tim O'Neil of PopMatters described the song as "the most specifically evocative track on the album". Mark Edwards of Stylus Magazine stated that the song, along with two other tracks, "Mausoleum" and "Faster", "takes your breath away", while commenting that the song is deeply disturbing. He also inferred that "it comes as close to glamourising anorexia as you can get".

Personnel 
Manic Street Preachers
 James Dean Bradfield – vocals, lead and rhythm guitars, production
 Richey Edwards – lyrics, production
 Nicky Wire – bass guitar, production
 Sean Moore – drums, production
Technical
 Alex Silva – engineering
 Mark Freegard – mixing

References 

Sources

External links 
 

1994 songs
Art rock songs
Gothic rock songs
Manic Street Preachers songs
Songs about eating disorders
Songs written by James Dean Bradfield
Songs written by Nicky Wire
Songs written by Richey Edwards
Songs written by Sean Moore (musician)